Marie-Fleur "Fleur" Agema (born 16 September 1976) is a Dutch politician and former spatial designer. As a member of the Party for Freedom (Partij voor de Vrijheid) she has been an MP since 30 November 2006. She focuses on matters of caregiving.

Biography

Early life 
Agema was born in Purmerend. She subsequently obtained a BA degree from the AKI ArtEZ University of the Arts in 1999, an MA degree in Architecture from the Academy of Architecture of the Amsterdam University of the Arts in 2001, and an MA degree in Fine Art from the Utrecht School of the Arts in 2004. From 1999 to 2003 she worked as a spatial designer and project leader for an architectural firm.

Politics
In March 2003 she was elected to the States-Provincial of North Holland, as a member of the Pim Fortuyn List. On October 17, 2003, she said had lost confidence in the governing board of the Pim Fortuyn List with two other State members of the Pim Fortuyn List. In 2004 she left the party, because of dissatisfaction with the continuing internal dispute. She continued as a member of the States-Provincial as an Independent. In 2006, she was a founding member of the Forza! Nederland party alongside former Pim Fortuyn List politician Paul Meijer, however she left shortly after its founding to join the Party for Freedom.

In 2006 she was asked by Geert Wilders, the party leader of the newly formed Party for Freedom, to join him on and get the second place on the list of candidates. In November 2006 she was chosen as a member of the Dutch House of Representatives. She left the States-Provincial on 14 March 2007. As an MP her main specialties are education, healthcare, spatial planning and infrastructure.

Personal 
In December 2012 Agema announced that she has been diagnosed with multiple sclerosis.

Agema went on maternity leave on 13 January 2015, she was replaced by Karen Gerbrands. On 17 February 2015 she gave birth to a daughter.

References

External links 

  House of Representatives biography

1976 births
Living people
20th-century Dutch architects
21st-century Dutch architects
21st-century Dutch politicians
21st-century Dutch women politicians
Dutch women architects
Members of the House of Representatives (Netherlands)
Members of the Provincial Council of North Holland
Party for Freedom politicians
People from Purmerend
People with multiple sclerosis
Pim Fortuyn List politicians
Utrecht School of the Arts alumni
20th-century Dutch women
20th-century Dutch people